Romanow or Romanów may refer to:

People 

 Roy Romanow, Canadian politician and former premier of Saskatchewan
 Royal Commission on the Future of Health Care in Canada, chaired by Roy Romanow and commonly known as the Romanow Report
 Michele Romanow, Canadian businessperson

Geography 

Romanów, Greater Poland Voivodeship (west-central Poland)
Romanów, Łódź East County in Łódź Voivodeship (central Poland)
Romanów, Sieradz County in Łódź Voivodeship (central Poland)
Romanów, Lower Silesian Voivodeship (south-west Poland)
Romanów, Gmina Janów Podlaski in Lublin Voivodeship (east Poland)
Romanów, Gmina Sosnówka in Lublin Voivodeship (east Poland)
Romanów, Krasnystaw County in Lublin Voivodeship (east Poland)
Romanów, Lublin County in Lublin Voivodeship (east Poland)
Romanów, Białobrzegi County in Masovian Voivodeship (east-central Poland)
Romanów, Gostynin County in Masovian Voivodeship (east-central Poland)
Romanów, Grójec County in Masovian Voivodeship (east-central Poland)
Romanów, Gmina Jedlińsk in Masovian Voivodeship (east-central Poland)
Romanów, Gmina Kowala in Masovian Voivodeship (east-central Poland)
Romanów, Silesian Voivodeship (Silesian Voivodeship)
Romanów, Świętokrzyskie Voivodeship (south-central Poland)